Inishdalla (Gaeilge: Inis Deala) is a small uninhabited island in County Mayo located to the south east of Inishturk, Ireland.

References

Islands of County Mayo
Uninhabited islands of Ireland